Lisa Sotilis is a Greek-Italian sculptor, painter and jewelry maker.

Biography 

Native of Athens (Greece), she studied art at the Academy of Fine Arts of Brera, Milan, Italy.

Personal life 

Lisa Sotilis is married to Dr. Theodore Vourlas, MD, Plastic and Reconstructive Surgeon, Otolaryngologist.

References

External links
 https://web.archive.org/web/20141218104045/http://sotilis.com/

Living people
Year of birth missing (living people)
Greek sculptors
Greek painters
Greek contemporary artists
Artists from Athens
21st-century Greek women artists